Indian laurel can refer to:

 Calophyllum inophyllum
 Ficus microcarpa (Chinese Banyan, Malayan Banyan)
 Ficus retusa
 Litsea glutinosa
 Terminalia elliptica

Though the leaves look similar, they are not at all related to Bay Laurel (Laurus nobilis).